The 1997 LPGA Tour was the 48th season since the LPGA Tour officially began in 1950. The season ran from January 9 to November 23. The season consisted of 38 official money events. Annika Sörenstam won the most tournaments, six. She also led the money list with earnings of $1,236,789.

There were four first-time winners in 1997: Cindy Figg-Currier, Pat Hurst, Michele Redman, and Wendy Ward. Nancy Lopez won the last of her 48 LPGA career victories in 1997.

The tournament results and award winners are listed below.

Tournament results
The following table shows all the official money events for the 1997 season. "Date" is the ending date of the tournament. The numbers in parentheses after the winners' names are the number of wins they had on the tour up to and including that event. Majors are shown in bold.

^ – weather-shortened tournament

Awards

References

External links
LPGA Tour official site
1997 season coverage at golfobserver.com

LPGA Tour seasons
LPGA Tour